Mighty Jets International FC is a Nigerian football club from Jos, playing in the Nigeria National League. They play at the Jos International Stadium, which has a capacity of 45,000.

History
They are one of only a half dozen active 'privately owned' professional clubs in Nigeria (not owned by state governments).

They were the first winners of the Nigerian League in 1972. They played at the top level until 1985.

Jets also have the record for losing the most FA Cup finals, losing 10 finals they've played in while winning none. They came close in the 1972 final, where they lost the replay 3–2 to Bendel Insurance after tying the first match 2–2 after a late goal from Garba Okoye. Jets also lost the 1974 cup final 2–0 to Enugu Rangers.

Jets were further demoted to the third division in 1994, spending three seasons there before being promoted back to the second division in 1997. The Jets' last time in the Premier League was a one-year stint in 2004. They finished at the bottom of the 18-team table with 28 points (7 wins, 7 ties and 20 losses) and then lost a promotion playoff against rivals Wikki Tourists when the league expanded to 20 teams. The season was worsened by their banishment to Owerri the last half of the season after crowd trouble. With a new board of directors in place in 2016, the club is targeting promotion to the Nigeria Premier League. Some of Mighty Jets former players  now play in the Nigeria Premier League.

Achievements
Nigerian Premier League: 1
1972

National Second Division: 1
2003

Performance in CAF competitions
African Cup of Champions Clubs: 1 appearance
1973: Second Round

CAF Cup Winners' Cup: 1 appearance
1975 – First Round

Current players

References

External links
Official Website
BBC SPORT- Clubs banished after rioting
allAfrica.com: God Will Destroy Those After Our Football

Football clubs in Nigeria
Jos
Association football clubs established in 1970
Fan-owned football clubs
1970 establishments in Nigeria
Sports clubs in Nigeria